Pudding Pops were frosty ice pop treats which were originally made and marketed by Jell-O. They were launched with a marketing campaign fronted by actor and comedian Bill Cosby.

Pudding Pops first originated in Baton Rouge, Louisiana in the 1970s in the United States, and became more popular in the 1980s. In their first year, they earned $100,000,000 and after five years were earning $300,000,000 annually. Despite strong sales into the 1990s, Pudding Pops were eventually discontinued due to no longer being profitable. 

They were reintroduced to grocery stores in 2004 under the brand name Popsicle. However, due to differences in texture to the original and being a different shape, their popularity never reached its previous height, and they began to be withdrawn from stores around 2011. Pudding Pops came in variety packs of chocolate, vanilla and chocolate vanilla swirl, which had 90 calories per serving, three grams of fat, and fifteen grams of carbohydrates.

See also
 List of frozen dessert brands

References

Brand name frozen desserts
Bill Cosby